"Bounce Back" is a song written by Michael Jay and Gregory Smith and originally recorded in 1987 as a demo by American pop singer-songwriter Martika. In 1988, the first version to be released was recorded by the Los Angeles-based duo Fire on Blonde. In 1990, the most commercially successful recording of the song was recorded by American freestyle and dance-pop singer Alisha for her same-titled album Bounce Back.

Martika version
In 1987, American pop singer-songwriter Martika, who had yet to sign with a record label, recorded a demo version of "Bounce Back", and appeared in a low-budget music video which aired on Entertainment '80. Martika would work with Jay on her 1988 debut album.

Fire on Blonde version

"Bounce Back" was recorded in 1987 by the Los Angeles based duo Fire on Blonde, made up of singer Suzie Benson and keyboardist Scott Rudress. The song was released by Atlantic Records as Fire on Blonde's third and final single release in 1988.

Fire on Blonde's version reached number 15 on the US Billboard Hot Dance Music Club Play chart and number 35 on the Hot Dance Music 12-inch Singles Sales chart. The song was also included as part of the soundtrack to the 1988 film Screwball Hotel.

Track listing
7-inch single
"Bounce Back" - 3:29
"Bounce Back" (Long Version) - 6:45

12-inch single
"Bounce Back" (12" Version) - 6:45
"Bounce Back" (Radio Version) - 3:29
"Bounce Back" (House Dub) - 5:52
"Bounce Back" (7" Remix) - 4:12
"Bounce Back" (Acapella) - 3:59

Personnel
Fire on Blonde
 Suzie Benson - lead vocals
 Scott Rudgress - keyboards

Production
 Michael Jay - producer
 Keith Cohen, Steve Beltran - remixes
 Linda Glick, Wong Design - graphic design

Charts

Alisha version

In 1990, "Bounce Back" was recorded and released by American freestyle and dance-pop singer Alisha. It was released as the lead single from her third studio album, Bounce Back.

Michael Jay produced the entire Bounce Back album and contributed a number of songs for it, including "Bounce Back" and "Wrong Number". "Bounce Back" gave the singer her highest charting position on the US Billboard Hot 100, peaking at number 54. It was also a success in the dance charts, reaching number 10 on the Billboard Hot Dance Music Club Play chart and number 26 on the Hot Dance Music 12-inch Singles Sales chart.

Critical reception
In a retrospective review of Bounce Back, Alex Henderson of AllMusic said, "Its best songs are 'Wrong Number' and the title song, both of which Jay had co-written and given to dance-pop duo Fire On Blonde in the 1980s. Fire's versions were superior, though Alisha's aren't bad."

Track listing
7-inch single
"Bounce Back" - 3:53
"I Need Forever" - 4:27

12-inch single (US release)
"Bounce Back" (LP Version) - 3:53
"Bounce Back" (7" Radio Remix) - 3:48
"Bounce Back" (12" Vocal Remix) - 7:07
"Bounce Back" (12" Techno-Bounce Dub) - 7:12

12-inch single (German release)
"Bounce Back" (Vocal Remix) - 7:07
"Bounce Back" (Radio Remix) - 3:48
"Bounce Back" (Techno-Bounce Dub) - 7:12

CD single (US promo)
"Bounce Back" (7" Radio Remix) - 3:48
"Bounce Back" (LP Version) - 3:53
"Bounce Back" (12" Vocal Remix) - 7:07

CD single (German release)
"Bounce Back" (LP/7" Version) - 3:53
"Bounce Back" (Radio Remix) - 3:48
"Bounce Back" (Vocal Remix) - 7:07
"I Need Forever" - 4:27

Cassette single
"Bounce Back" (LP Version) - 3:53

Charts

Personnel
 Alisha - lead vocals
 Mark Leggett - guitar
 Brad Cole - keyboards, arranger, drum programming on "I Need Forever"
 Gregory Smith - keyboards, arranger
 Michael Jay - drums, percussion
 Donna DeLory, Mona Lisa Young, Rick Jude Palombi - backing vocals
 Marvin Morrow - vocal sampling

Production
 Michael Jay - producer, arranger
 Hugo Dwyer, Justin Strauss - remixes
 Justin Strauss - additional production
 Eric Kupper - programmer, additional keyboards
 Hugo Dwyer - remix engineer
 Chep Nuñez - editing
 Michael McDonald - mixing, recording, engineer
 Alejandro Rodriguez, Jim Champagne, Neal H. Pogue - assistant engineers
 Steve Marcussen - mastering

References

1987 songs
1988 singles
1990 singles
Martika songs
Atlantic Records singles
MCA Records singles
Songs written by Michael Margules